Liviu Voinea (born 26 June 1975) is Romania's representative to the International Monetary Fund and Senior Advisor to the IMF Executive Director starting 26 August 2019. In this capacity he is a member of the Executive Board of the International Monetary Fund. He also represents Montenegro to the IMF.

Prior to that, he was Deputy Governor of the National Bank of Romania between October 2014 and August 2019. In that capacity, he was a member of: the European Systemic Risk Board; the Economic and Financial Committee of the European Commission; the International Relations Committee, European Central Bank; the Financial Stability Board – Regional Consultative Group for Europe. He was a member of the High Level Working Group on Regulatory of Sovereign Exposures.

He served as Minister Delegate for Budget between December 2012 and August 2014, member of the Romanian Government, responsible for budget and public debt. In that capacity he was Romania’s representative to the Economic and Financial Council; Romania’s Governor to the World Bank, EBRD and EIB. During his mandate, Romania exited the excessive deficit procedure, met the medium term objective of the structural deficit, issued Eurobonds with longest maturities to date (30 years for dollar-denominated bonds), build up a foreign exchange buffer, and reached investment grade from all major rating agencies. Prior to that, he was Deputy Minister of Finance (May 2012 – December 2012), responsible for public policies.

Liviu Voinea has been Professor of macroeconomics at the Academy of Economic Studies, Faculty of International Business and Economics, Bucharest, since 2013. Prior to that, he was Senior Lecturer at the National School of Political and Administrative Studies. 

He is also a member of the Principles Consultative Group of the Institute of International Finance.

Education
Liviu Voinea graduated from Academy of Economics, Faculty of International Business. He has a Master of Science in Business Administration degree from Stockholm University, School of Business. In 2000 he obtained the Ph.D. in Economics from the Academy of Economics, Faculty of Economics.

Awards

Romanian Academy's "Virgil Madgearu" Award in economic sciences, 2007 for the book Transnational corporations and global capitalism

Research
Liviu Voinea was post-doctoral researcher at the Institute for Prospective Technological Studies, Joint Research Center of the European Commission, based in Seville, Spain (2004). After returning to Romania, he co-founded the Group of Applied Economics (GEA), where he was Director of Research and then Executive Director. 

He published articles in journals such as Journal of International Money and Finance, Review of International Political Economy, Economics of Transition, as well as IMF Working Paper and World Bank Policy Research Working paper (details in the main publications and references sections). He recently published a book on inflation, consumption and savings at Palgrave Macmillan (“Defensive Expectations. Reinventing the Phillips Curve as a Policy Mix”).

Main publications

Voinea, L., "Defensive Expectations. Reinventing the Phillips Curve as a Policy Mix". Palgrave Macmillan (2021).
Nier, E., Popa, R., Shamloo, M., Voinea, L., “Debt Service and Default: Calibrating Macroprudential Policy Using Micro Data”. IMF Working Paper 19/182, 2019.
Voinea, L. et al., "One Hundred Years of Honesty: Recovering the Lost Memory of the Romanian Economy 1918-2018". Publica (2019), Kindle Edition. 
Voinea, L., "The post-crisis Phillips Curve and its policy implications: cumulative wage gap matters for inflation". SUERF (2019).
Voinea, L., "Explaining the post-crisis Phillips curve: Cumulated wage gap matters for inflation". CEPS (2018).
Voinea, L., Lovin, H., Cojocaru, A., "The Impact of Inequality on the Transmission of Monetary Policy". Journal of International Money and Finance (2017), Elsevier, vol. 85(C), pages 236–250.
Voinea, L. (coord), "Un Veac de Sinceritate. Recuperarea memoriei pierdute a economiei romanesti 1918-2018". Publica, 2018.
Voinea, L., Alupoaiei,A., Dragu, F., Neagu, F., Chapter: Adjustments in the balance sheets – is it normal, this "new normal"? in Debt Default and Democracy". 2018, (editors: Giuseppe Eusepi and Richard Wagener), Edward Elgar Publishing.
Heemskerk, F., Voinea, L., Cojocaru, A., "Busting the Myth: The Impact of Increasing the Minimum Wage : The Experience of Romania". (English), 2018, Policy Research working paper; no. WPS 8632. Washington, D.C.: World Bank Group.
Voinea, L. "Revisiting Crisis Generators in Romania and other EU’s New Member States", Review of International Political Economy, vol. 20, no.4, 2013, pp. 979–1008.
Voinea, L., Mihăescu, F., "A contribution to the public-private wage inequality debate: the iconic case of Romania", Economics of Transition, vol.20 (2), 2012, pg. 315-337.
Voinea, L., (co-editor), "New Policy changes for European Multinationals", Vol. 7 Progress in International Business Research, 2012, pg. 119-135 (Liviu Voinea, Flaviu Mihaescu, Andrada Busuioc, "The Impact of Transaction Costs on Interest". Margins in the Romanian Banking Sector), and pg. 1-27 (Alain Verbeke, Rob van Tulder, Liviu Voinea, "New Policy Challenges for European Multinationals: A Resource Bundling Perspective"), pg. 467, Emerald, London
Voinea, L., Mihăescu, F., "The impact of flat tax on inequality. The case of Romania", Romanian Journal of Economic Forecasting vol. XII, no.4, 2009, pg.19-41, 
Voinea, L., The end of illusion economics: crisis and anti-crisis. A heterodox approach, Publica (in Romanian) 179 pg., 2009
Voinea, L. Stephan, L., "Market concentration and innovation in transnational corporations. Evidence from foreign affiliates in Central and Eastern Europe", in Progress in international business research (eds: Tiia Vassak, Jorma Larimo), Vol. 4, Research on knowledge, innovation and internationalization, 2009, Emerald, London, pg. 207–224, 271 pg.
Voinea, L., Mihăescu, F., "What Drives Foreign Banks to South East Europe?", Transformations in business and economics, vol. 57, no 3(15), Supplement C, 2008, pg.107–122.
Voinea, L., Transnational corporations and global capitalism, Polirom (in Romanian), 198 pg., 2007
Voinea, L., "Has CEFTA been a training ground for EU accession? The case of Romania", International Journal of Trade and Global Markets, vol.1, no.1, 2007, pg.53–68, 
Voinea, L., "As Good as it Gets? FDI Dynamics and Impact in Romania" published in Foreign Direct Investment Policies in South East Europe, 2006, Jovancevic, R., Z.Sevic (Eds), pg.231–250, 329 pg., Greenwich University Press
Voinea, L. "Specialization without change: foreign direct investment and Romania’s foreign trade" in New economists about Romania's transition (coordinators: Mugur Isarescu, Daniel Daianu), pg.605–624, 624 pg., Enciclopedica (in Romanian), Collection National Bank Library, 2003.

References
 Google Scholar
 Bank for International Settlements
 Palgrave

Conferences (selected)
București, April 2019, The EUROFI HIGH LEVEL SEMINAR 2019, panel AML-TF: improving supervision and detection.
Londra, March 2019, speaker at the Conference National Asset - Liability Management Europe 2019 Summit
Londra, February 2019, Romania Investor Days, Wood & Company
Indonesia, October 2018, IMF/World Bank Annual Meeting
Jordan, May 2018, BERD Annual Meeting
Brussels, May 2018, speaker at the CEPS-IMF Spring 2018 Regional Economic Outlook Conference, "Europe – managing the upswing in uncertain times"
Brussesls, May 2018, speaker at the ninth Debt Management Facility Stakeholder's Forum Rising Tide of Debt: Risk, Resilience, Responsibility
Washington, April 2018, IMF/World Bank Spring Meeting
Buenos Aires, March 2018, BIS – G20 meeting for Central Banks 
Bucharest, October 2017, "10 years of Romania's EU membership - Looking through the future"
Lisabona, September 2017, "Trade-offs in modern central banking" speaker at the Joint Banco de Portugal and ECB conference on risk management for central banks
Cluj-Napoca, September 2017, "Macroeconomic disparities at regional level in Romania", speaker at the "Regional Polarisation and Unequal Development in CEE: Challenges for Innovative Space-based Policies" conference
Bruxelles, September 2017, "Finance and housing in central and eastern europe: A demand-side approach" speaker at the Bruegel Annual Meetings
Bucharest, August 2017, "Romania in the Euro Area: when and how?" speaker at the Annual Meeting of Romanian Diplomacy
Nicosia, May 2017, "Romania - Financial sector", organised by EBRD
Washington, D.C., April 2017, "Breaking the back of NPLs – the Romanian experience" organised by IMF
Bucharest, May 2016, speaker at the "Romania's Convergence: The Way Forward" IMF conference
Johns Hopkins University, November 2016 – "Macroeconomic developments in Romania"
Zurich, October 2016, conference"Monetary Policy, Macroprudential Regulation and Inequality", organized by Council on Economic Policies (CEP) and International Monetary Fund (IMF)
Washington, October 2016, speaker at the JP Morgan Investor Seminar
Washington, October 2016, IMF/WB annual meetings 
Vienna, January 2016, speaker at The Central & Eastern European Forum organized by Euromoney 
Lima, October 2015, speaker at the JP Morgan Investor Seminar
St. Louis, September 2015, conference "Monetary Policy and the Distribution of Income and Wealth", organized by Federal Reserve Bank of St. Louis
Washington, June 2015, 15th Annual International Conference on Policy Challenges for the Financial Sector, Federal Reserve/WB/IMF
Tbilisi, May 2015, speaker at the EBRD Business Forum 
Washington, April 2015, speaker at the JP Morgan Investor Seminar
Zagreb, March 2015, speaker at The Institute of Economics
Vienna, January 2015, speaker at The Central & Eastern European Forum organized by Euromoney 
Warsaw, December 2014, speaker at the "New Member States Policy Forum" organized by IMF
Warsaw, May 2014, speaker at The Institute of International Finance (IIF) Conference "Annual Meeting of CEE CEOs"
Washington, April 2014, speaker at the JP Morgan Investor Seminar
Vienna, January 2014, speaker at The Central & Eastern European Forum organized by Euromoney
Vilnius, September 2013, speaker at The Eurofi Financial Forum
Krynica, September 2013, speaker at The Economic Forum 
Stockholm, September 2012, guest speaker at the Stockholm School of Economics
Berlin, February 2012, guest speaker at the  "Which Europe do we want?"conference, Friedrich Ebert Stiftung and Das Progressive Zentrum
Providence, New York, September 2011, guest lecturer – Brown University, Watson Institute
New Delhi, March 2011, IIF Annual Conference
Paris, March 2008, speaker at the OECD Global Forum on Investments
Bruxelles, April 2007, speaker at the Centre for European Policy Studies
Budapest, June 2006, guest lecturer at the Central European University
European International Business Academy Annual Conferences (Bucharest -2011,Porto -2010, Valencia -2009, Fribourg -2006, Ljubljana – 2004, Copenhagen – 2003)

External links
https://scholar.google.ro/citations?user=jvL-aEMAAAAJ&hl=en&oi=ao
http://www.bnr.ro/NBR-Deputy-Governor-11575.aspx
http://www.ft.com/intl/cms/s/0/554cadda-c567-11e3-a7d4-00144feabdc0.html#axzz3xEsD7YCX
http://www.bloomberg.com/news/articles/2013-11-22/s-p-may-raise-romania-to-investment-grade-next-year
https://www.reuters.com/article/romania-energy-tax-idUSL6E8JEBEJ20120814
https://www.reuters.com/article/romania-cenbank-banks-idUSA8N10F01U20151006
https://www.reuters.com/article/romania-government-pm-idUSL8N1344IQ20151109
http://www.bloomberg.com/news/articles/2014-01-15/romania-to-sell-more-international-bonds-by-end-june
https://www.reuters.com/article/us-romania-eurozone-idUSBREA450L320140506
http://www.bloomberg.com/news/articles/2014-04-15/romania-sells-10-year-eurobond-as-yields-fall-to-record-lows
http://www.bloomberg.com/news/articles/2013-09-17/second-poorest-eu-nation-yields-best-bonds
http://www.abebooks.com/servlet/BookDetailsPL?bi=14352316280&searchurl=an%3Drob%2520van%2520tulder%2520alain%2520verbeke%2520liviu%2520voinea
http://www.euinside.eu/en/news/wolfgang-schaeuble-the-peremptory-tone-of-the-ep-is-unacceptable
http://www.capital.ro/liviu-voinea-voinea-romania-este-cu-arme-si-bagaje-in-vest.html
http://www.bloomberg.com/news/articles/2014-02-11/emerging-europe-needs-steps-to-spur-demand-voinea-writes-in-ft
http://www.alamy.com/stock-photo-brussels-bxl-belgium-6th-may-2014-romanian-minister-delegate-for-budget-69027717.html
http://washington.mae.ro/gallery/730
http://tvnewsroom.consilium.europa.eu/video/shotlist/roundtable3834810554
http://www.zf.ro/eveniment/mostenirea-lui-voinea-la-buget-un-deficit-mic-dar-care-a-trimis-tara-in-recesiune-aceleasi-datorii-dar-la-dobanzi-mai-amici-un-rating-de-tara-mai-bun-si-mania-baronilor-psd-13156482
http://www.zf.ro/eveniment/din-sanctuarul-bnr-in-cusca-cu-lei-a-guvernarii-liviu-voinea-propunerea-psd-pentru-premier-mingea-este-acum-la-iohannis-daca-il-accepta-14880298

Romanian economists
Living people
1975 births